Iridomyrmex tenebrans is a species of ant in the genus Iridomyrmex. Described by Heterick and Shattuck in 2011, the ant is a rare species endemic to Australia, with only one specimen being collected in New South Wales.

Etymology
The name derives from the Latin Language, and the name is translated to 'rendered obscure'.

References

Iridomyrmex
Hymenoptera of Australia
Insects described in 2011